Tonbridge and Malling is a local government district with borough status in Kent, England. Tonbridge is the largest settlement but the authority is based in the modern development of Kings Hill.

Geography
Tonbridge and Malling Borough covers an area from the North Downs at Burham and Snodland in the north to the town of Tonbridge in the south. The River Medway meanders north-east through the borough towards the Medway Gap, having in the west of the area received the River Eden. The castle-passing Eden Valley Walk is also mostly in this borough.

Administrative history
The district was created on 1 April 1974 by the merger of the urban district of Tonbridge, together with Malling Rural District and the civil parishes of Hadlow and Hildenborough from Tonbridge Rural District. The district received borough status on 16 December 1983 and the council was renamed Tonbridge and Malling Borough Council. The ceremonial head of the council, the chairman, was known as mayor after that date.

History and architecture

Ancient times
The area has been occupied for thousands of years. The Neolithic people left behind much evidence: megaliths such as Kit's Coty House at Aylesford and the Coldrum Stones at Trottiscliffe; and the Long barrows at Addington being examples. Bronze and Iron Age finds are also plentiful. There is evidence of the Romano-British civilisation along the Medway Valley.

The immediate district of Tonbridge is omitted from the Domesday Book; however most other settlements in the Borough are included. Castles were built at Tonbridge, Allington and West Malling in the 13th century. Religious houses: Malling, Aylesford and Tonbridge were built: one such was St Mary's Abbey dating from 1092. Aylesford Priory on the banks of the Medway, was built in the 13th century.

There are surviving medieval manor houses including Ightham Mote and Old Soar Manor.

19th century onwards

Description

Kentish ragstone geologically speaking is the Upper Greensand Ridge, used in church building in Kent.

Modern times

The land included is mainly agricultural – orchards, and livestock in the main – although major business parks and buildings within  coupled with the railways and the motorway means a majority of working residents commute to work in the more built-up villages and Tonbridge. The new settlement of Kings Hill can be regarded as tied in with the economy of Maidstone equally with that of parts of Kent further to the western extremity.

A remnant of the once flourishing hop-growing industry is provided by a tourist attraction at Beltring: once the Whitbread Hop Farm, it puts on weekend exhibitions and shows. Tonbridge and Malling has 27 listed buildings in the highest category of the national system, Grade I. This includes eight churches, five reduced structures left over from St Mary's Abbey or Malling Abbey, West Malling and four manor houses, mostly built by lower social ranks than the titled nobility.

A diverse materials and appearance construction is Ightham Mote which is recognised in the highest category of the UK's architecture listing system, Grade I, though no longer in private hands.
East Malling Research Station disseminates results of research into matters affecting horticultural crops, with particular emphasis on the fruit, hop and nursery stock industries.

Many of the villages are beside long-distance walks with tourist accommodation, enabling tours of the orchards and bluebell woods.

Housing
Housing ranges from mid-rise in relatively small areas of towns to low-rise housing, generally with gardens in the villages and most parts of the towns.

Local government

Borough

See Tonbridge and Malling Borough Council elections for historic political control and leadership.

Tonbridge and Malling Borough Council's main offices are at the Gibson Building in Kings Hill; this is the converted and extended officers' mess building from the former RAF West Malling. The council moved to the Gibson Building in November 1974, just a few months after the council's creation. The council also has an office at Tonbridge Castle, which had been the offices of the former Tonbridge Urban District Council.

Following the 2015 elections, the political makeup of the council was the following: 48 Conservative, 4 Liberal Democrats and 2 Independents.

Following the 2019 election the council is still under Conservative control, as it has been since 2003.

Wards
The borough is divided for borough council elections into 26 wards, including seven in the town of Tonbridge (Cage Green, Castle, Higham, Judd, Medway, Trench and Vauxhall wards). Outside the town, councillors serve wards covering the following villages or groups of villages, many of which have parish councils also (see below):
 Aylesford
 Blue Bell Hill and Walderslade
 Borough Green and Long Mill
 Burham, Wouldham and Eccles
 Ditton
 Downs
 East Malling,
 East Peckham and Golden Green
 Hadlow, Mereworth and West Peckham
 Hildenborough
 Ightham
 Kings Hill
 Larkfield – two wards: North and South
 Snodland – two wards: East and West
 Wateringbury
 West Malling and Leybourne
 Wrotham

Civil parishes
The lower tier of local government is the civil parish. In this district they are as follows:

Tonbridge, being the former area of Tonbridge Urban District Council, is an unparished area.

In the Parliament of the United Kingdom, the area is covered by the larger Tonbridge and Malling Parliamentary Constituency and part of Chatham and Aylesford Parliament constituency.

Mayors and chairmen

Population
In the 2011 census the population was 120,805.

Transport
Six railway routes operate through the borough.

The South Eastern Main Line on the route London – Tonbridge – Ashford International – Dover crosses the west of the borough with stations at Hildenborough and Tonbridge.

The Maidstone East Line on the route Victoria – Maidstone East – Ashford International – Canterbury – Thanet with its stations at Borough Green & Wrotham, West Malling for Kings Hill, East Malling and Barming crosses the north of the borough.

From Tonbridge, the Hastings line services run to Tunbridge Wells and Hastings, with some through services from Hastings to London, and the Redhill to Tonbridge Line services run to Redhill: through services on that line to Guildford have been discontinued.

The High Speed 1 line with Eurostar services crosses the north of the borough, but there are no stations here, although southeastern high speed commuter services to / from London St Pancras call at Snodland during the morning and evening peak periods.

The Medway Valley Line links the North Kent Line at Strood with the South Eastern Main Line at Paddock Wood railway station.  Stations are at Snodland, New Hythe, and Aylesford on the Strood – Maidstone West section of the line in the north of the borough and Wateringbury on the Maidstone West – Paddock Wood section of the line in the south of the borough.  Beltring and Brandbridges Halt is close to the borough boundary.  Trains on this line now run through from Paddock Wood to Tonbridge, but through services from Maidstone West via Strood to London Bridge have been discontinued.

The borough has road routes passing through it. There are three motorways: the M2, M20 and the M26; three west-east roads (A20; A21 and the A26 road). Three other roads of similar stature are the A227, A228 and A229.

In addition there are long distance footpaths, among them the Greensand Way, the Medway Valley Walk, the Wealdway and the Eden Valley Walk.

Youth radio station
Tonbridge and Malling has youth projects and organisations including Cupid FM, the first ever youth radio station or project of its kind within the area. The project received funding and support from Kent County Council and Tonbridge & Malling Borough Council, and during 2006 set up a studio and online broadcast which came to a close in November of that year. The station was run by local teens and music was populated by the latest chart hits.

Freedom of the Borough
The following people and military units have received the Freedom of the Borough of Tonbridge and Malling.

Individuals

Military Units
 The Princess of Wales's Royal Regiment.
 29 Squadron, RAF.

See also
 List of places of worship in Tonbridge and Malling

References
Kent History Illustrated Frank W Jessup (KCC, 1966)

External links
 Tonbridge and Malling Borough Council

 
Non-metropolitan districts of Kent
Boroughs in England